Psilopygoides is a genus of moths in the family Saturniidae erected by Charles Duncan Michener in 1949.

Species
Psilopygoides oda (Schaus, 1905)

References

Ceratocampinae